Festive Five: You Decide is a special event that happened between 23 December and 26 December 2009 on Disney Channel (UK and Ireland), where kids who watch the channel during December could vote for their No. 1 programme. Voting lines closed on 15 December. Nominations included Wizards of Waverly Place, Sonny With A Chance, Hannah Montana, JONAS and The Suite Life on Deck. It airs 1075 minutes for each episode, 6am - 12.30am the next day. The winner was JONAS.

Episodes

Places

External links
Official Website

Disney Channel (British and Irish TV channel) original programming